The 2018 California State Senate elections were held on Tuesday, November 6, 2018, with the primary election being held on June 5, 2018. Voters in the 20 even-numbered districts of the California State Senate elected their representatives. The elections coincided with the elections of other offices, including for governor and the California State Assembly.

The Democratic Party gained three seats: the 12th, 14th, and 34th districts. These victories provided the Democrats with 29 seats and restored the two-thirds supermajority that they lost after the recall of Democratic state senator Josh Newman in June 2018.

Overview

District 2

The 2nd district stretches along the North Coast from the Oregon border in the north to the San Francisco Bay Area in the south. It includes all of Del Norte County, Humboldt County, Lake County, Marin County, Mendocino County, and Trinity County, as well as a majority of Sonoma County. The incumbent is Democrat Mike McGuire, who was elected with 70.0% of the vote in 2014.

Candidates
Mike McGuire (Democratic), incumbent State Senator
Veronica Jacobi (Democratic), former Santa Rosa city councilwoman and candidate for California's 10th State Assembly district in 2014 and 2016

Results

District 4

The 4th district encompasses the Sacramento Valley, mainly taking in rural farmland as well as Chico, and the Sacramento metropolitan area, including Carmichael, and parts of Rancho Cordova. The incumbent is Republican Jim Nielsen, who was reelected with 63.7% of the vote in 2014.

Candidates
Phillip Kim (Democratic), community organizer and campaign staffer for Bernie Sanders 2016 presidential campaign
Jim Nielsen (Republican), incumbent State Senator
Michael Worley (Democratic), Chico Area Recreation and Park District board member

Results

District 6

The 6th district is located in the core of the Sacramento metropolitan area, including the state capital of Sacramento and surrounding suburbs. The incumbent is Democrat Richard Pan, who was elected with 53.8% of the vote in 2014.

Candidates
Janine DeRose (Libertarian)
Eric Frame (no party preference), activist
Jacob Mason (Democratic), factory worker
Richard Pan (Democratic), incumbent State Senator

Results

District 8

The 8th district stretches from the Sacramento suburbs to Death Valley. It encompasses most of the southern Sierra Nevada, Gold Country, and parts of the Central Valley, including parts of Fresno, Clovis, and Turlock. The incumbent is Republican Tom Berryhill, who is term-limited and cannot run for reelection.

Candidates
Mark Belden (no party preference), businessman
Andreas Borgeas (Republican), Fresno County supervisor
Paulina Miranda (Democratic), businesswoman and nominee for California's 8th State Senate district in 2014
Tom Pratt (Democratic), Vallecito Union School board member and insurance agent

Results

District 10

The 10th district is located in the southern coastal East Bay and parts of Silicon Valley, including Hayward and Milpitas. The incumbent is Democrat Bob Wieckowski, who was elected with 68.0% of the vote in 2014.

Candidates
Victor G. San Vicente (Republican), real estate and mortgage broker
Ali Sarsack (Libertarian), military veteran and design engineer
Bob Wieckowski (Democratic), incumbent State Senator

Results

District 12

The 12th district takes in the Salinas Valley and a swath of the Central Valley between Modesto and Fresno. The incumbent is Republican Anthony Cannella, who is term-limited and cannot run for reelection.

Candidates
Anna Caballero (Democratic), state assemblywoman for California's 30th State Assembly district, former Salinas mayor and city councilwoman
Daniel Parra (Democratic), candidate for California's 21st congressional district in 2016
Rob Poythress (Republican), Madera County supervisor and former Madera mayor and city councilman
Johnny Tacherra (Republican), nominee for California's 16th congressional district in 2014 and 2016

Results

District 14

The 14th district takes in parts of the southern Central Valley. It takes in heavily Latino portions of Fresno and Bakersfield, along with Delano, Hanford, and Porterville. The incumbent is Republican Andy Vidak, who was reelected with 54.1% of the vote in 2014.

Candidates
Melissa Hurtado (Democratic), Sanger city councilwoman
Ruben Macareno (Democratic), former chairman of Tulare County Democratic Central Committee
Abigail Solis (Democratic), Earlimart School District trustee
Andy Vidak (Republican), incumbent State Senator

Results

District 16

The 16th district consists of the southeastern Central Valley and the High Desert. Much of the population is in the western parts of the district in the Central Valley, anchored by Bakersfield and Visalia, while the desert regions in the eastern half consist of scattered settlements, such as Barstow and Yucca Valley. The incumbent is Republican minority Senate leader Jean Fuller, who is term-limited and cannot run for reelection.

Candidates
Shannon Grove (Republican), former state assemblywoman for California's 34th State Assembly district
Ruth Musser-Lopez (Democratic), archaeologist, former Needles city councilwoman, and nominee for California's 16th State Senate district in 2014
Gregory Tatum (Republican), church pastor

Results

District 18

The 18th district consists of the eastern San Fernando Valley, including parts of Burbank, as well as the Los Angeles neighborhoods of Northridge, Sherman Oaks, and Van Nuys. The incumbent is Democrat Robert Hertzberg, who was elected with 70.2% of the vote in 2014.

Candidates
Robert Hertzberg (Democratic), incumbent State Senator
Rudy Melendez (Republican)
Roger James Sayegh (Democratic)
Brandon Saario (Republican)

Results

District 20

The 20th district encompasses parts of the Inland Empire, including Chino, Fontana, Ontario, and parts of San Bernardino. The incumbent is Democrat Connie Leyva, who was elected with 62.4% of the vote in 2014.

Candidates
Paul Vincent Avila (Democratic), former Ontario city councilman
Connie Leyva (Democratic), incumbent State Senator
Matthew Munson (Republican), inventory processor and nominee for California's 20th State Senate district in 2014

Results

District 22

The 22nd district is located in the southern coastal encompasses the San Gabriel Valley and parts of the foothills. The incumbent is Democrat Ed Hernandez, who is term-limited and cannot run for reelection.

Candidates
Mike Eng (Democratic), Los Angeles Community College District trustee, former assemblyman for California's 49th State Assembly district,  and former mayor of Monterey Park
Monica Garcia (Democratic), Baldwin Park city councilwoman
Susan Rubio (Democratic), Baldwin Park city councilwoman
Ruben Sierra (Democratic), union organizer

Results

District 24

The 24th district encompasses central Los Angeles and its immediate environs, including East Los Angeles, Eagle Rock, and Koreatown. The incumbent is Democrat State Senate President pro tempore Kevin de León, who is term-limited and cannot run for reelection.

Candidates
Peter Choi (Democratic), small business owner and nominee for California's 24th State Senate district in 2014
Maria Elena Durazo (Democratic), co-chair of AFL–CIO's immigration committee and vice-chair of Democratic National Committee

Results

District 26

The 26th district is centered around the South Bay and Westside regions. The incumbent is Democrat Ben Allen, who was elected with 60.3% of the vote in 2014.

Candidates
Ben Allen (Democratic), incumbent State Senator
Baron Bruno (no party preference), realtor and Libertarian nominee for California's 62nd State Assembly district in 2016
Mark Matthew Herd (Libertarian), Westwood neighborhood councilman

Results

District 28

The 28th district is located in eastern Riverside County, including Cathedral City, Murrieta, Palm Springs, and Temecula. The incumbent is Republican Jeff Stone, who was elected with 53.0% of the vote in 2014.

Candidates
Anna Nevenic (Democratic), registered nurse, candidate for California's 41st congressional district in 2012, and candidate for California's 28th State Senate district in 2014
Joy Silver (Democratic), affordable housing advisor
Jeff Stone (Republican), incumbent State Senator

Results

District 30

The 30th district is located in Los Angeles County including Culver City, Ladera Heights, Westmont and the Los Angeles neighborhoods of Crenshaw, Downtown, and Florence. The incumbent is Democrat Holly Mitchell, who was reelected with 68.8% of the vote in 2014.

Candidates
Holly Mitchell (Democratic), incumbent State Senator

Results

District 32

The 32nd district takes in the Gateway Cities region in southeastern Los Angeles County, as well as Buena Park. The incumbent is Democrat Tony Mendoza, who was elected with 52.3% of the vote in 2014, resigned following sexual assault allegations. However, he decided to run for election again following his resignation.

Note that the primary was held the same day as the special election to fill a vacancy in the seat. Although most of the candidates in the two contests were the same, the results were very different. Rita Topalian finished first in both races, but different candidates finished in second place. Vanessa Delgado finished in 2nd place in the special election, but 3rd place in the regularly scheduled primary election. She received a similar number of votes in both races, but candidate Bob Archuleta received about 54% more votes in the regularly scheduled election than he did in the special election. The different results have been attributed to the different order in which the candidates were listed on the ballot.

Candidates
Bob Archuleta (Democratic), Pico Rivera city councilman
Rudy Bermudez (Democratic), former assemblyman for California's 56th State Assembly district (2002-2006) and former Norwalk city councilman
David Castellanos (Democratic)
Vanessa Delgado (Democratic), mayor of Montebello
Tony Mendoza (Democratic), former State Senator for California's 32nd State Senate district
Vivian Romero (Democratic), Montebello city councilwoman
Vicky Santana (Democratic), vice president of Rio Hondo College board
Ion Sarega (Republican), former candidate for La Mirada city council
Ali S. Taj (Democratic), Artesia city councilman
Rita Topalian (Republican), attorney and nominee for California's 57th State Assembly district in 2014 and 2016

Results

District 34

The 34th district is centered around western Orange County, including parts of Anaheim, as well as Garden Grove and Santa Ana. The district also takes in coastal areas, including parts of Huntington Beach and Long Beach. The incumbent is Republican Janet Nguyen, who was elected with 58.1% of the vote in 2014.

Candidates
Akash A. Hawkins (Democratic)
Janet Nguyen (Republican), incumbent State Senator
Jestin L. Samson (Democratic), local activist
Tom Umberg (Democratic), former State assemblyman for California's 69th State Assembly district (2004-2006) and California's 72nd State Assembly district (1990-1992)

Endorsements

Results

General election results by county. Blue represents counties won by Umberg. Red represents counties won by Nguyen.

District 36

The 36th district encompasses southern Orange County and the North County region of San Diego County. The incumbent is Republican Patricia Bates, who was elected with 65.7% of the vote in 2014.

Candidates
Patricia Bates (Republican), incumbent State Senator
Marggie Castellano (Democratic), businesswoman

Results

District 38

The 38th district encompasses the East County and inland region of San Diego County. The incumbent is Republican Joel Anderson, who is term-limited and cannot run for reelection.

Candidates
Jeff Griffith (Democratic), firefighter and paramedic
Brian Jones (Republican), Santee city councilman and former state assemblyman for California's 77th State Assembly district (2010-2012) and California's 71st State Assembly district (2012-2016)
Antonio Salguero (Libertarian)

Results

District 40

The 40th district runs along the entire border between California and Mexico, taking in rural Imperial County as well as the South Bay region of San Diego County. The incumbent is Democrat Ben Hueso, who was reelected with 54.9% of the vote in 2014.

Candidates
Ben Hueso (Democratic), incumbent State Senator
Luis R. Vargas (Republican), former California superior court judge

Results

See also
2018 United States elections
2018 United States Senate election in California
2018 United States House of Representatives elections in California
2018 California gubernatorial election
2018 California State Assembly election
2018 California elections

References

State Senate
California State Senate elections
Politics of California
California State Senate